Samir Kadhim Hassan  is an Iraqi football defender who played for Iraq in the 1996 Asian Cup. He also played for Al Wakra

Samir was a dominating and aggressive man-marker and a regular for the Iraqi national team during the 1990s. He was a member of Iraq's Asian Youth Championship winning team in 1988 in Doha, Qatar which included goalkeeper Emad Hashim, captain Radhi Shenaishil and attacking midfielder Laith Hussein.

A year later, Samir participated in the World Youth Cup, helping Iraq top a group featuring Argentina, Norway and Spain, but in the 2nd round the Iraqi team lost 2–1 to USA.

Samir was part of the 1998 World Cup campaign that ended when Iraq lost home and away to Kazakhstan. Samir retired from the national team in 1999, 10 years after making his debut.

Coaching career
Daham has managed many teams, Al-Diwaniya FC (Iraq), and is coaching Al-Samawa FC (Iraq) now.

Al Samawa FC
On June 24, 2019, Kadhim was appointed as Al-Samawa FC manager, he had six games left to make the team stay in the Iraqi Premier League. Kadhim had to get a win at least to make the dream come true. That's what happened when Al-Samawa FC won Kadhim's third game 2–1 against Amanat Baghdad which was the main success for Kadhim, he ended the season with one win, three draws and a two loses. On July 30, Samir Kadhim renewed his contract with the Al-Samawa FC after talks with Al-Quwa Al-Jawiya because of some administrative problems.

Managerial statistics

References

External links
 11v11 Profile

1969 births
Living people
Iraqi footballers
Iraq international footballers
1996 AFC Asian Cup players
Association football defenders
Al-Quwa Al-Jawiya managers
Iraqi football managers